Richard Howlett  was Dean of Cashel  from 1639 until 1641: 
In the Irish Rebellion of 1641 his house and goods were plundered.

References 

Deans of Cashel
17th-century Irish Anglican priests